E632 may refer to:
 FS Class E632, a class of Italian railways electric locomotives
 The E number for dipotassium inosinate